Pallickathodu, also spelled Pallikkathodu which includes Anickadu village, is a town in eastern Kottayam district, Kerala, India. It falls under the Kanjirappally assembly constituency.

Economy
Pallickathodu has a predominantly agricultural economy.  The major products include: rubber; banana; and pineapple with rubber constituting the largest share.

Government institutions
Pampady Block is situated at Pallickathode. BSNL Telephone Exchange, Government Treasury, Post Office, Village Office, Panchayath Office, Agricultural Office, Animal Husbandry Dispensary etc. are also there.

Educational institutions
The village has two high schools, one higher secondary school, NSS Higher Secondary School and two CBSE affiliated schools, Sacred Heart Convent Senior Secondary School which is managed by CFMSS sisters and Aravinda Vidya Mandiram Senior Secondary School (since 1990) run by Aravinda Charitable trust which is also affiliated to Bharatheeya Vidyanikethan, a kerala unit of Vidyabharathi.
The government Upper Primary School is the first school in the area which established in AD 1910 at Mandiram Junction.
The Govt ITI Pallickathodu is 1 km away from town. It offers various courses and trainings. An Engineering College, Kottayam Institute of Technology & Science, Chengalam, is nearly 5 km from Pallickathodu. There is also a Government ITI (Industrial Training Institute) of the Govt Of Kerala, at Pallickathode. K R Narayanan Film Institute also located 2 km from the Pallickathodu.

Temple
The Anickadu Bhagavathy Temple situated at the heart of the city on the beautiful hill. The temple is a best example of communal harmony at the place. People from all religions are allowed to enter and worship Bhagavathy. The temple festival on Meena bharani is a great one-week celebration. During this period various art forms will be staged. It includes major set Katha kali, Ottamthullal, Katha prasangam, Drama, Dance Drama, music performances etc.  The Kazcha Sree Bali at Pallickathodu town is a beautiful event.  With five decorated elephants panchavadyam, Mayil attom (Peacock dancing) chenda melam (drum), etc. all the people in and near to Pallickathodu enjoy it.  The Garudan Dance is one of the main offering to the Bhavathy. There are only a few temples in Kerala, where Garudan Parava ( Garudan Dance ) is done.
Another big celebration in the temple is Kumbhakudam on Pathamudayam in Medom (March/April) every year.
Sankara Narayana Moorthy Temple situated 1 km from town. It is a very famous temple and its main speciality is a Hanuman Temple with equal importance. Another temple in the vicinity is the Vattakakkavu Bhagavathy Kshetram, managed as a trusteeship under the Chiramangalam family. The annual festival ('Utsavam') happens in the month of April.

Church
Mar Gregorios orthodox church is just 0.5 km from town, St Mary's Church Anickad is just 1.5 km away and Aruvikuzhy Lourde Matha Church ( Syro-Malabar) is one of the most famous churches of the region. This is 2 km away from pallickathodu and its under diocese of Changanacherry.

Tourism 
Aruvikkuzhy Waterfalls is a waterfall near Kottayam in the Kerala state of India. It is situated 2 km from Pallickathode. The waterfall measures about 30 ft in height and active only during monsoon and In summer the river almost dries up.

References

Villages in Kottayam district